Naval Medical Research Unit Dayton (NAMRU-D) is a biomedical research laboratory of the United States Navy in Dayton, Ohio. It is one of seven subordinate commands of the Naval Medical Research Center and incorporates two research divisions. The Environmental Health Effects Laboratory was established in 1959 in Bethesda, Maryland, and moved to Dayton in 1976.  NAMRU-D's predecessor organization, the Naval Aerospace Medical Research Laboratory (NAMRL), dates back to 1939 when it was established as an aviation medical research unit at Naval Air Station Pensacola, Florida.  Pursuant to a 2005 Base Realignment and Closure Commission decision, NAMRL began incrementally relocating to Dayton in late 2010. and was formally disestablished at NAS Pensacola in September 2011. Despite being a Navy activity, NAMRU-D was set up on the grounds of Wright-Patterson Air Force Base at Dayton so it could be co-located with similar U.S. Air Force activities.

History 
The U.S. Navy Toxicology Unit was established in January 1959 in response to air quality issues within the first nuclear-powered submarine, USS Nautilus, as well as toxicity concerns about replacements for flammable hydraulic fluids. It was initially based at the National Naval Medical Center in Bethesda, Maryland, and by 1965 had 22 personnel. Around that time, its building was condemned because of structural deficiencies, but due to funding difficulties for a new building they continued to occupy it through 1976, when the building was about to be lost to termites. In May 1975, the Navy Toxicology Unit was incorporated into the Naval Medical Research Institute. The following year it was relocated to Wright-Patterson Air Force Base in Dayton, increasing collaboration with the Air Force toxicology program.

An aviation medicine research and training unit was established in 1939 at Naval Air Station Pensacola, which in 1946 became part of the newly established Naval School of Aviation Medicine, later called the Naval Aerospace Medical Institute (NAMI). In 1974 it was separated into its own independent command as the Naval Aerospace Medical Research Laboratory (NAMRL). Multiple different research projects have been conducted at NAMRL, such as research on human performance limitations by LCDR Justin S. Brown, USN, the Reduced Oxygen Breathing Device (ROBD), and the Tactile Situation Awareness System (TSAS) by Capt. Angus Rupert, USN. In June 2010, it moved to Ohio and merged with the Environmental Health Effects Laboratory to form NAMRU-D as part of the 2005 Base Realignment and Closure process.

List of Commanders of Predecessor Units

List of Commanding Officers of Naval Medical Research Unit Dayton

References

External links 
 Official website

Military medical research of the United States Navy
Wright-Patterson Air Force Base
1959 establishments in Maryland